El Fardou Mohamed Ben Nabouhane (born 10 June 1989), known as El Fardou Ben, Ben Nabouhane or simply Ben, also called by Red Star Belgrade fans as Big Ben is a Comorian professional footballer who plays as a forward for Cypriot First Division club APOEL and the Comoros national team.

Club career

Early career
Born in Passamainty in the French overseas collectivity of Mayotte, Ben moved to the island of Réunion to play for the Réunion Premier League club JS Saint-Pierroise. In 2006, he joined Le Havre.

After spending one year in the reserves, El Fardou was promoted to the senior squad. He made his professional debut and start for Le Havre on 3 March 2008 in a Ligue 2 match against Troyes AC, playing 72 minutes before being substituted. He made one more appearance that season and though he did not contribute that much, he still received a winner's medal as Le Havre were crowned Ligue 2 champions and were promoted to Ligue 1 for the 2008–09 season.

Ben did not see much time in Ligue 1 play early on, instead playing in the reserves. He received his first call up to the squad for their Coupe de la Ligue match against Rennes, held on 12 November 2008. In the match, which he started, he scored his first professional goal in the 15th minute, contributing to Le Havre's 2–1 win over Rennes. He made his Ligue 1 debut just three days later in a match against Paris Saint-Germain.

Veria
After three years playing for Ligue 2 side Vannes OC, he signed a two-year contract with Greek Super League side Veria. He made his debut with the club in an away draw against Platanias in August 2013. He was named Superleague's second top scorer during the 2013–14 Superleague Greece season as he scored 15 goals with Veria. During his second season at Veria he scored his first season goal in a home victory against Xanthi, also grabbing an assist during that match as well as during the second matchday against OFI. He got injured for two weeks and he returned to the pitch as a substitute against PAS Giannina. Ben scored against Xanthi in a 2–2 away draw, while he also assisted the second goal with which Nikos Kaltsas equalized the score. On 17 January 2015, Ben scored twice against OFI in a 4–1 home victory and he was eventually named as the MVP of the 19th matchday.  He was also offered a three-year contract extension after the OFI away victory, with triple wages, but it was rejected as the player demanded higher wages. His contract was set to expire on 30 June 2014. On 20 April 2015 Ben also scored twice against Asteras Tripoli in a 4–0 home victory, also assisting one. In the second season, 2014–15 Superleague Greece with the club, he went on to score ten goals and assist eight.

Olympiacos
In July 2015, Ben signed a contract with Greek giants Olympiacos on a free transfer from Veria. According to newspapers rumours Levadiakos was not the only Greek club interested in signing Ben, with Platanias also considering signing him in the January transfer window. The Comoros international suffered a serious cruciate ligament injury in May and was surplus to requirements for Olympiacos manager Marco Silva. On 29 December 2015, since he did not manage to earn a single appearance with the club, he signed a six-month contract with Levadiakos until the end of 2015–16 season. On 10 January 2016, in his first appearance with his new club, he scored in a 3–1 away loss against Olympiacos.

On 8 July 2016, he signed a two-year contract with Panionios for the 2016–17 season, on loan from Olympiacos. On 3 December 2016, in his 9th appearance with the club he scored the only goal for his team in a 1–1 away draw against Platanias. He finished the 2016–17 season as the top scorer and MVP of the club.

On 26 July 2017, after his loan at Panionios expired, Ben scored a brace for Olympiacos in a 3–1 victory against Partizan in the first leg of the UEFA Champions League third qualifying round. With only ten appearances with the club in all competitions in the first half of the 2017–18 season, Ben attracted the interest of Serbian club Red Star Belgrade, which offered him a three-year contract. On 19 December 2017, the Comorian international striker was dropped from the Olympiacos first-team squad after deciding not to extend his contract.

Red Star Belgrade
On 12 January 2018, Ben signed a -year contract with Red Star Belgrade. The transfer fee was estimated to be €500,000. His contract, which runs until 2020, is worth €1 million plus bonuses.

On 29 August 2018, Ben scored twice, each time from an assist by Miloš Degenek, in the 2–2 draw with Red Bull Salzburg; as a result Red Star Belgrade qualified to the group stage of the 2018–19 UEFA Champions League. On 28 November 2018, he scored his first UEFA Champions League goal in a 3–1 defeat against Napoli in the 2018–19 season. On 29 October 2020, he scored a brace in a 5–1 win over Slovan Liberec in the 2020–21 UEFA Europa League.

APOEL 
On 16 January 2023, Ben officially joined Cypriot side APOEL on a permanent deal, signing a contract until May 2025 with the club.

International career
On 5 March 2014, he made his international début with Comoros, in a friendly against Burkina Faso. Subsequently sidelined with a serious injury with his club, he returned to action to help his national team reach the qualifying competition of a major international tournament for the first time in their history, a goal they have been pursuing since 2007. On 24 March 2016, it was Ben who scored the only goal of the Africa Cup of Nations preliminary qualifying round match against Botswana, his country's first-ever win in a competitive international.

In January 2022, Ben was selected to the Comoros squad at the 2021 Africa Cup of Nations, the country's first ever appearance in a major tournament. On 18 January 2022, he scored the first goal in the final group stage match at the tournament, in a 3–2 win against Ghana. The result eliminated Ghana and earned his nation a berth in the knockout stages.

Career statistics

Club

International
Scores and results list Comoros' goal tally first, score column indicates score after each Ben Nabouhane goal.

Honours
Red Star Belgrade
 Serbian SuperLiga (5): 2017–18, 2018–19, 2019–20, 2020–21, 2021-22
 Serbian Cup (2): 2020–21, 2021–22

Individual
2014–15 MVP awards: Matchday 19, Matchday 31
NOVA Superleague Awards 2014: Best team (Forward)
Serbian SuperLiga Team of the Season: 2018–19

References

External links
 Profile on Le Havre AC Website
 LFP Profile

1989 births
Living people
Citizens of Comoros through descent
Comorian footballers
Comoros international footballers
French footballers
French sportspeople of Comorian descent
Mayotte footballers
Association football forwards
Le Havre AC players
JS Saint-Pierroise players
Vannes OC players
Veria F.C. players
Naturalized citizens of Serbia
Olympiacos F.C. players
Levadiakos F.C. players
Panionios F.C. players
Red Star Belgrade footballers
APOEL FC players
Ligue 1 players
Ligue 2 players
Championnat National players
Serbian SuperLiga players
Super League Greece players
Cypriot First Division players
Comorian expatriate footballers
Expatriate footballers in Réunion
Expatriate footballers in Greece
Expatriate footballers in Serbia
Expatriate footballers in Cyprus
2021 Africa Cup of Nations players